The 1980 United States House of Representatives elections in Texas occurred on November 4, 1980, to elect the members of the state of Texas's delegation to the United States House of Representatives. Texas had twenty-four seats in the House apportioned according to the 1970 United States Census.

These elections occurred simultaneously with the United States Senate elections of 1980, the United States House elections in other states, the presidential election, and various state and local elections.

Democrats maintained their majority of U.S. House seats from Texas, but they lost one seat to the Republicans, decreasing their majority to nineteen out of twenty-four seats on the coattails of president Ronald Reagan's election.

Overview

Congressional Districts

District 1 
Incumbent Democrat Sam B. Hall ran for re-election unopposed.

District 2 
Incumbent Democrat Charlie Wilson ran for re-election.

District 3 
Incumbent Republican James M. Collins ran for re-election.

District 4 
Incumbent Democrat Ray Roberts opted to retire rather than run for re-election.

District 5 
Incumbent Democrat Jim Mattox ran for re-election.

District 6 
Incumbent Democrat Phil Gramm ran for re-election.

District 7 
Incumbent Republican Bill Archer ran for re-election.

District 8 
Incumbent Democrat Bob Eckhardt ran for re-election.

District 9 
Incumbent Democrat Jack Brooks ran for re-election unopposed.

District 10 
Incumbent Democrat J. J. Pickle ran for re-election.

District 11 
Incumbent Democrat Marvin Leath ran for re-election unopposed.

District 12 
Incumbent Democrat Jim Wright ran for re-election.

District 13 
Incumbent Democrat Jack Hightower ran for re-election.

District 14 
Incumbent Democrat Joseph Wyatt opted to retire rather than run for re-election.

District 15 
Incumbent Democrat Kika de la Garza ran for re-election.

District 16 
Incumbent Democrat Richard Crawford White ran for re-election.

District 17 
Incumbent Democrat Charles Stenholm ran for re-election unopposed.

District 18 
Incumbent Democrat Mickey Leland ran for re-election.

District 19 
Incumbent Democrat Kent Hance ran for re-election.

District 20 
Incumbent Democrat Henry B. González ran for re-election.

District 21 
Incumbent Republican Tom Loeffler ran for re-election.

District 22 
Incumbent Republican Ron Paul ran for re-election.

District 23 
Incumbent Democrat Abraham Kazen ran for re-election.

District 24 
Incumbent Democrat Martin Frost ran for re-election.

References

1980
Texas
1980 Texas elections